Sodium laurate is a chemical compound with formula CH3(CH2)10CO2Na. As the sodium salt of a fatty acid (lauric acid), it is classified as a soap. It is a white solid.

Use
Sodium laurate is frequently used in bars of soap as an ingredient. Sodium laurate is also a permitted bleaching, washing and peeling agent.

References

Laurates
Organic sodium salts
Anionic surfactants